Japanese relocation may refer to World War II events:

 Japanese American internment
 Japanese Canadian internment
 Japanese Relocation (1942 film)